Knockout Kings is a video game developed by American studio Press Start and published by EA Sports for the PlayStation.

Gameplay
Knockout Kings features 38 pro boxers with motion-capture animation. The game also had exclusive rights for boxers Muhammad Ali, Evander Holyfield, Sugar Ray Leonard and Oscar De La Hoya.

Reception
Next Generation reviewed the PlayStation version of the game, rating it two stars out of five, and stated that "The game sorely misses the excitement of the sport, and in turn, fails to make it fun."

Reviews
Official PlayStation Magazine #16 (1999 January)
GameSpot - Dec 01, 1998
Game Informer Magazine - Dec, 2000
IGN - Dec 03, 1998
Game Revolution - Dec 01, 1998
Super Play - Feb, 1999
Power Unlimited - Feb, 1999
Gamezilla
Absolute Playstation
Computer and Video Games

References

1998 video games
Boxing video games
Multiplayer and single-player video games
PlayStation (console) games
PlayStation (console)-only games
Video games developed in the United States